Dawes may refer to:

Places
Dawes (Parish), New South Wales, Australia
Dawes Point, New South Wales, Australia
Dawes Arboretum, in Newark, Ohio, U.S.
Dawes County, Nebraska, U.S.
Dawes Township, Thurston County, Nebraska, U.S.

Other uses
Dawes (band), an American rock band
Dawes (lunar crater)
Dawes (Martian crater)
Dawes (surname)
Dawes Act of 1887, regarding allocation of Native American tribal land
Dawes Commission
Dawes Rolls
Dawes Cycles, a British bicycle manufacturer
Dawes Plan, a 1924 plan to resolve the World War I reparations

See also
Daw (disambiguation)
Dawe (disambiguation)
Daws (disambiguation)
Simon Dawes, an American rock band 
Dawes' limit, a formula to express the maximum resolving power of a microscope or telescope